Bhārat Mātā (Mother India in English) is a national personification of India (Bharat ) as a mother goddess. In the visual arts she is commonly depicted dressed in a red or saffron-coloured sari and holding a  national flag; she sometimes stands on a lotus and is accompanied by a lion. 

Although the mother and motherland were sometimes ranked higher than heaven in ancient Sanskrit literature, the idea of the mother goddess, Bharat Mata, dates to the late 19th century.  She appeared first in the popular Bengali language-novel Anandamath (1882) in a form inseparable from the Hindu goddesses Durga and Kali.  After the controversial division of Bengal province in 1905, she was given wider notice during the boycott of British-made goods organized by Sir Surendranath Bannerjee.  In numerous protest meetings, she appeared in the rallying cry Vande Mataram (I bow to the mother).

Bharat Mata was painted as a four-armed goddess by Abanindra Nath Tagore in 1904 in the style associated with the Bengal School of Art and is displayed in the Victoria Memorial Museum in Kolkata. Secular representations of India also came to accompany her.  By the late-19th century, maps of India produced by the British Raj, and based on the Great Trigonometrical Survey, had become widely available.  With the background of a map, Bharat Mata appeared on the cover of the poet Subramania Bharati's Tamil language-magazine Vijaya in 1909.  In the decades following, she appeared throughout India in popular art—in magazines, posters, and calendars—becoming a symbol of Indian nationalism. 

There are a handful of Bharat Mata temples in India.  The first such was inaugurated by Mahatma Gandhi in Benares (now Varanasi) in 1936. The temple has a large relief map of India sculpted in marble on its floor but lacks a murti or cult image statue.  A wall displays a poem written for the inauguration by the nationalist Hindi language-poet Maithili Sharan Gupt and proclaiming the temple to be open to all castes and religions.  Most visitors to the temple are foreign tourists. Indian Muslims have opposed chanting her name because human forms cannot be deified in Islam.

Introduction and meaning

The concept of bhārat mātā as the personification of the Indian subcontinent came into existence starting in the late 19th century, especially after the Indian Rebellion of 1857 against the British. Bhārat Mātā as a concept was first perceived to be an image of the land of India prominently by Bankim Chandra Chatterjee in his book Anand Math in 1880 and by Abanindranath Tagore through a 1905 painting.

Historic perspective
The image of Bhāratmātā formed with the Indian independence movement of the late 19th century. A play by Kiran Chandra Bannerjee, Bhārat Mātā, was first performed in 1873. The play, set during the 1770 Bengal famine, depicts a woman and her husband who go to the forest and encounter rebels. A priest takes them to a temple where they are shown Bharat Mata. Thus they are inspired and lead a rebellion which results in the defeat of the British. The Manushi magazine story traces origin to a satirical work Unabimsa Purana or The Nineteenth Purana by Bhudeb Mukhopadhyay which was first published anonymously in 1866. Bankim Chandra Chattopadhyay in 1882 wrote a novel Anandamath and introduced the hymn "Vande Mātaram", which soon became the song of the emerging freedom movement in India. As the British Raj created cartographic shape of India through the Geological Survey of India, the Indian nationalist developed it into an icon of nationalism. In 1920s, it became more political image sometimes including images of Mahatma Gandhi and Bhagat Singh. The Tiranga flag was also started being included during this period. In 1930s, the image entered in religious practice. The Bharat Mata temple was built in Benaras in 1936 by Shiv Prashad Gupt and was inaugurated by Mahatma Gandhi. This temple does not have any statuary but only a marble relief of the map of India.
Bipin Chandra Pal elaborated its meaning in idealizing and idealist terms, along with Hindu philosophical traditions and devotional practices. It represented an archaic spiritual essence, a transcendental idea of Universe as well as expressing Universal Hinduism and nationhood.

Abanindranath Tagore portrayed Bhārat Mātā as a four-armed Hindu goddess wearing saffron-colored robes, holding the manuscripts, sheaves of rice, a mala, and a white cloth. The image of Bharatmata was an icon to create nationalist feeling in Indians during the freedom struggle. Sister Nivedita, an admirer of the painting, opined that the picture was refined and imaginative, with Bharatmata standing on green earth and blue sky behind her; feet with four lotuses, four arms meaning divine power; white halo and sincere eyes; and gifts Shiksha-Diksha-Anna-Bastra of the motherland to her children.

Indian Independence activist Subramania Bharati saw Bharat Mata as the land of Ganga. He identified Bharat Mata as Adi Parashakti. He also says that he has got the Darśana of Bharat Mata during his visit with his guru Sister Nivedita.

Significance

In the book Everyday Nationalism: Women of the Hindu Right in India, Kalyani Devaki Menon argues that "the vision of India as Bharat Mata has profound implications for the politics of Hindu nationalism" and that the depiction of India as a Hindu goddess implies that it is not just the patriotic but also the religious duty of all Hindus to participate in the nationalist struggle to defend the nation. This association has caused controversy with devout Muslims, whose belief in the oneness of God keeps them from assigning divinity to any god other than Allah.
The motto Bharat Mata ki Jai’ ("Victory for Mother India") is used by the Indian Army. In contemporary colloquial usage, however, the expression is analogous to "Long live Mother India" or "Salute to Mother India." (See also Jai Hind.) Muslim-majority Indonesia's several dozen national armed units also use Hindu-origin Sanskrit language mottoes, including the National Armed Forces, Army, Navy, for example the Indonesian Air Force's motto Swabhuana Paksa ("Wings of The Motherland") and the Indonesian National Police's motto Rastra Sewakottama or "राष्ट्र सेवकोत्तम" ("Nation's main servants").

Bhārat Mātā temples

Varanasi
The Bharat Mata Temple is located in the Mahatma Gandhi Kashi Vidyapeeth campus in Varanasi. The temple houses a marble idol of Bharat Mata along with a marble relief map of India.

The Temple, a gift from the nationalists Shiv Prasad Gupta and Durga Prasad Khatri, was inaugurated by Mahatma Gandhi in 1936. Mahatma Gandhi said, "I hope this temple, which will serve as a cosmopolitan platform for people of all religions, castes, and creeds including Harijans, will go a great way in promoting religious unity, peace, and love in the country."

Haridwar
The temple was founded by Swami Satyamitranand Giri on the banks of the Ganges in Haridwar. It has 8 storeys and is 180 feet tall. It was inaugurated by Indira Gandhi in 1983. Floors are dedicated to mythological legends, religious deities, freedom fighters and leaders.

Kolkata 
The temple is located in Michael Nagar on Jessore Road, barely 2 km away from the Kolkata Airport. Here, Bharat Mata (the Mother Land)  is portrayed through the image of "Jagattarini Durga". This was inaugurated on October 19, 2015 (Mahashashti Day of Durga Puja that year) by Shri Keshari Nath Tripathi, the Governor of West Bengal. The initiative to build the temple, which has been named Jatiya Shaktipeeth, was taken by the Spiritual Society of India in order to mark the 140th Anniversary of "Vande Mataram", the hymn to the Mother Land.

Kurukshetra 
In July 2019, the Chief Minister of Haryana, Manohar Lal Khattar, granted 5 acre land near Mahabharta-era Jyotisar tirth to the "Bharat Mata Trust" of "Juna Akhara" to construct the next temple of Bharat Mata.

See also
 Banga Mata
 Sri Lanka Mata 
 Telugu Thalli
 Siam Devadhiraj
 Mother India (magazine)

References

External links

  The Hindu, August 17, 2003.
 The life and times of Bharat Mata Sadan Jha, Manushi, Issue 142.
 Bharat Mata Images Prof. Pritchett, Columbia University

Toponyms for India
National personifications
Hindu goddesses
Mother goddesses
National symbols of India
Hindu nationalism
Indian independence movement